Seduction is the debut studio album by English gothic rock band the Danse Society. It was released in September 1982 on the band's own record label, Society. It includes a song inspired by the David Lynch film Eraserhead.

Track listing

Release 
Seduction reached No. 3 in the UK Indie Chart.

In 2001, Cherry Red Records reissued a remastered, expanded edition of the album, Seduction: The Society Collection, as part of its Anagram Goth series. It included the original six-track album plus eight additional tracks taken from their early independent singles.

Critical reception 
Trouser Press panned the album, calling it a "longwinded six-track 12-inch with busy Bauhaus-strength mud supporting sporadic vocals and gimmicky sound effects. Tuneless and tedious".

Personnel 
 The Danse Society

 Steven Victor Rawlings – vocals, sleeve concept
 Lyndon Scarfe – keyboards, production
 Paul Nash – guitar, production, sleeve concept
 Tim Wright – bass guitar, production
 Paul Gilmartin – drums, production

 Technical

 Tim Parry – production

References

External links 

 

1982 albums
Post-punk albums by English artists
The Danse Society albums